Shima is a given name.

Notable people
Shima Iwashita (born 1941), Japanese actress
Shima Kakoku (1827-1870), Japanese photographer
Shima Mehri (born 1980), Iranian biker
Shima Nikpour (born 1988), Iranian actress
Shima Niavarani (born 1985), Iranian-Swedish actress
Shima Ryū (1823-1900), Japanese artist
Shima Sakon (1543-1600?), Japanese samurai
Shima Yoshitake (1822-1874), Japanese samurai

See also
Shima (surname)
Shima (disambiguation)

Given names
Japanese unisex given names